Isla Blair Glover (born 29 September 1944) is a British actress and singer. She made her first stage appearance in 1963 as Philia in the London debut of A Funny Thing Happened on the Way to the Forum.

Early life and education
Isla Blair was born in Bangalore, India, on 29 September 1944. Her father, Ian Baxter Blair-Hill, was a British tea planter of Scottish descent. Blair's interest in performing arts first became apparent when, at the age of two, she gave an impromptu singing performance on the boat ride from India to England. She went on to attend the Royal Academy of Dramatic Art to prepare for a career in acting.

Career 
Blair made her first stage appearance at the Strand Theatre on 3 October 1963 playing the part of Philia in the London debut of A Funny Thing Happened on the Way to the Forum. She joined the Royal Shakespeare Company for their 1971 season, during which she portrayed Emilia in The Man of Mode and Aglaya in Subject to Fits. In 1973, Blair toured the Middle East with the Prospect Theatre Company in the role of Viola in Twelfth Night. Other venues at which Blair has performed include the Old Vic and the Nottingham Playhouse.

One of Blair's earliest experiences working in film was in a scene with Paul McCartney in the 1964 film A Hard Day's Night. McCartney offered to drive Blair home after the shoot, but upon exiting the building, the two were swarmed by fans who scratched and kicked Blair in an attempt to reach McCartney. The following day, she declined a second offer of a ride from McCartney. The scene they had been filming, which was Blair's only scene in the movie, was eventually cut and lost.

Her first credited film appearance was in the 1965 horror film Dr. Terror's House of Horrors as an art gallery assistant. Her other film appearances include A Flea in Her Ear (1968), Battle of Britain (1969), Taste the Blood of Dracula (1970), Indiana Jones and the Last Crusade (1989, as the wife of her real-life husband Julian Glover, and credited as Mrs. Glover), Valmont (1989), The Monk (1990), The House of Angelo (1997), The Match (1999), Mrs Caldicot's Cabbage War (2002), AfterLife (2003) and Johnny English Reborn (2011).  

Blair guest starred in two episodes of Space: 1999; appearing in 1975, along with Anthony Valentine, in War Games and in 1976, along with Freddie Jones, in Journey to Where. In 1976, Blair played Emma Antrobus in the ITV drama series The Crezz. She played a principal role (Sally) in the BBC's alternative history TV serial An Englishman's Castle, first broadcast in 1978. One of her best known TV appearances was as Flora Beniform in The History Man (1981) alongside Anthony Sher. Blair played Claire Carlsen, Francis Urquhart's Parliamentary Private Secretary, in The Final Cut (1995). In 2003, she played opposite John Nettles in an episode of Midsomer Murders as a psychological profiler. She played Nanny Langton in The Star of Jacob, Father Brown (S5:E1, 2016).
She played the part of a foreign agent, disguised as a bride, in The Avengers episode "A Funny Thing Happened On The Way To The Station". (1967)

In 2010, she appeared at The Orange Tree Theatre, Richmond in The Company Man by Torben Betts. She was nominated for an Off West End Award as Best Actress. 

Blair has narrated many audiobooks. In 2014–15 she appeared in the stage musical Made in Dagenham.

Personal life
Blair is married to fellow actor Julian Glover, with whom she has a son, actor Jamie Glover. Along with Prunella Scales, Blair and Glover were involved with the expansion of the Salisbury Playhouse.  She was vice president of TACT, the Actors' Children's Trust in 2015 and trustee in 2018.

Filmography

Film

Television

References

External links

1944 births
British television actresses
British stage actresses
Living people
Actresses from Bangalore
Royal Shakespeare Company members
20th-century British actresses
British voice actresses
21st-century British actresses
Alumni of RADA